Jesse Wayne Heiman (born May 23, 1978) is an American actor and comedian, best known for his uncredited work as an extra in a wide variety of films and television shows. He is also known for appearing in a GoDaddy commercial at Super Bowl XLVII, alongside Bar Refaeli and Danica Patrick.

Early life
Jesse Heiman was born in Boston on May 23, 1978, moving to Austin, Texas in 1989 where he attended West Ridge Middle School, Westlake High School, and Texas State University. Heiman graduated in May 2000 with a Bachelor of Arts in English and moved to Los Angeles in September.

Heiman began acting as a background extra in 2000 and has appeared in innumerable films, television shows, commercials, and music videos.

Career
Heiman's first major role was in American Pie 2. His first speaking role was on the short lived television show Maybe It's Me. Other roles include being one of the pledges in the film Old School and the MTV spring break show Camp Cool Cancun. He previously guest starred in the TV shows NCIS, Curb Your Enthusiasm, Entourage, Ned's Declassified School Survival Guide and was an extra as a BuyMore Employee on NBC's Chuck. He also starred in the video for "I'm Just a Kid" by Simple Plan.

Heiman portrayed Dan Bronson for a Lost-themed viral video during the 2008 Comic-Con.

On March 14, 2011, a video compilation was uploaded to YouTube, showing clips of Heiman's various appearances. Within days of the video being online, the video had over 2 million views.

Heiman appeared in GoDaddy's Super Bowl XLVII commercial with Bar Refaeli and Danica Patrick, in which Refaeli, a supermodel, and Heiman share a graphic french kiss. Following the response to GoDaddy's Super Bowl XLVII commercial, Los Angeles based porn company Assence Films extended an offer to Heiman to appear in an adult film of his choosing. Heiman responded to the offer saying "I will hold out for Playgirl". As a play on the GoDaddy commercial, singer Michael Bublé cast Heiman in the opening scene of his video "It's a Beautiful Day" where Bublé walks in on Jaime Pressly, who plays his significant other in the comical video, and Heiman sharing a kiss, to which Bublé responds by singing the song. Despite his age, he still portrays teenagers and young adults as an extra.

Partial filmography

References

External links

 
 
 

1978 births
Male actors from Los Angeles
American male film actors
American male television actors
Living people
Male actors from Boston
Male actors from Austin, Texas
Texas State University alumni
GoDaddy